Háj  is an observation tower on the top of Háj hill in Olomouc Region of the Czech Republic, about 3 kilometres northwest from Šumperk. Its height is 29 meters and it has one viewing platform. Foot tower altitude is 631 meters above sea level.

History
The current observation tower replaced the original Štefánik's Observation Tower which was erected in 1934 and burned down after a lightning strike in 1953. The new structure was built 43 years later, in 1996.

Investors were the municipalities of Šumperk, Bludov, Ruda nad Moravou, the now defunct Šumperk District and telephone operators who use the tower as a transmitter.

References

Towers completed in 1934
Towers completed in 1996
Observation towers in the Czech Republic
Šumperk District
1934 establishments in Czechoslovakia
20th-century architecture in the Czech Republic